Patricia "Patti" Starr (born ) is a former administrator and novelist. She was the chair of Ontario Place from 1986 to 1989. In 1989 she was implicated in a political scandal that resulted in her being convicted of fraud and breach of trust for which she spent two months in jail. In 1996 she received a full pardon. Since then she has written a book about the affair entitled, Tempting Fate: A cautionary tale of power and politics and has also written two novels. She now works as a researcher and a 'fact checker'.

Background
Starr was born in Toronto, Ontario. Starr received her training at Ryerson University. Today, she heads her own consulting business that specializes in research and fact-checking.

Ontario Place
In 1987 she was appointed to the chair of Ontario Place by premier David Peterson. During her tenure she achieved a substantial drop in the operating deficit, rejuvenating the fledgling park.

Patti Starr affair

In February 1989, The Globe and Mail published an article that said that the National Council of Jewish Women of Canada had made contributions to political parties in contravention of the Federal Income Tax Act. The donations were made under the direction of Starr who claimed that the donation method was not covered under the act. She labelled it as a loophole or a "grey area". Gordon Murray, a director at Revenue Canada said that she was mistaken and that charities were specifically barred from contributions to partisan political causes.

In March, the national council stripped the officers of the executive, including Starr of their powers. In May Starr stepped down as president of the charity but denied it had anything to do with the investigation. In June, she resigned as chair of Ontario Place. In the same month, a leaked report listed several prominent politicians as having received donations in 1987. These included provincial Health Minister Elinor Caplan, Transportation Minister Ed Fulton, Federal Conservative MP Bill Attewell and Toronto Mayor Art Eggleton. These revelations led to a cabinet shuffle by Peterson in which five ministers who had received contributions lost their positions.

Legal proceedings
On June 24, 1989, Peterson ordered a judicial inquiry be set up to investigate the matter. Initially Starr said wanted to participate in the inquiry. She said, "I stand by all the things I participated in ... I think the inquiry will be a positive thing." Later on she moved to have the inquiry quashed. In January 1990, the Ontario Court of Appeal dismissed her request. Two weeks later the Supreme Court of Canada gave her leave to appeal. In a decision in April, the Supreme Court declared the inquiry unconstitutional. Starr successfully argued that an inquiry investigating criminal charges would deny subjects their full legal rights. Public inquiries can compel witnesses to testify but criminal trial defendants can refuse to testify.

Soon after, the police laid 76 charges plus over 30 violations of election spending laws against Starr. She was charged with defrauding the Ministry of Citizenship and Culture in collecting $350,000 more than her organization was entitled to in grants for renovations to its offices. The Liberal Party and several party officials were also charged with fraud and breach of trust.

Starr felt unfairly singled out by the affair and launched a lawsuit against Peterson, his adviser Vince Borg, Attorney-General Ian Scott, the province and the cabinet for $3 million in damages for negligence, defamation, malicious prosecution and abuse of power.

Trial
In June 1991, Starr pleaded guilty to eight election fraud expense charges for which she was fined $3,500. 28 other charges were withdrawn or were dismissed. She also pleaded guilty to two criminal charges (out of 11 originally laid), breach of trust in using $33,000 of charitable funds for her own purposes and fraud in obtaining $360,000 in government grant funds that was more than her organization was entitled to. She was sentenced to two six-month jail terms to be served concurrently. Justice Ted Wren and Crown Prosecutor Peter Griffiths agreed with Mrs. Starr’s counsel, Peter West, now superior court Judge West, on the statement of facts that included the following comments by Justice Wren presented in an open courtroom to the media and the public present: “Notwithstanding there was no personal financial benefit to Mrs. Starr and her colleagues were surely aware of her activities on their behalf, an example must be made as a general deterrent to the public because of the high profile of this case”.  She was paroled after serving two months of her sentence.

Repercussions
The "Patti Starr Affair" as it was called in the press was one of the contributing factors that led to the Liberal government's defeat in the 1990 provincial election. Polls showed that more than half of respondents felt that Peterson had poorly handled the matter and 61% felt that it revealed widespread corruption in the government. Of longer lasting significance was the Supreme Court of Canada's decision regarding the constitutionality of the public inquiry. The decision has been cited repeatedly in other similar situations including the Westray Mine disaster of 1992 and the Algo Centre Mall collapse in Elliot Lake in 2012.

Later life
In 1996 Starr received a full and unconditional pardon from the government of Canada.

Starr is the author of one book about her political rise and fall Tempting Fate: A cautionary tale of power and politics (1993) and three works of fiction: Deadly Justice (1997), Final Justice (2002) and The Third Hole (2013). She is also the Associate Editor of the Blue Book of Canadian Business

References

External links

1943 births
Canadian memoirists
Canadian women novelists
Living people
Writers from Toronto
Canadian women memoirists